The 2014 French motorcycle Grand Prix was the fifth round of the 2014 MotoGP season. It was held at the Bugatti Circuit in Le Mans on 18 May 2014.

Classification

MotoGP

Moto2

Moto3

Championship standings after the race (MotoGP)
Below are the standings for the top five riders and constructors after round five has concluded.

Riders' Championship standings

Constructors' Championship standings

 Note: Only the top five positions are included for both sets of standings.

References

French motorcycle Grand Prix
French
Motorcycle Grand Prix
French motorcycle Grand Prix